Brainiac 8 (Indigo) is a fictional superhero character appearing in American comic books published by DC Comics.

Publication history
Brainiac 8 first appeared in Titans/Young Justice: Graduation Day #1 and was created by Judd Winick and Alé Garza.

Fictional character biography
Indigo is a Coluan and a member of the Outsiders. Born in a distant future era, she comes to the 21st century badly damaged, and desperately looks for a cybernetic or mechanical organism capable of repairing her. In the process, she tries to install her self-repairing routines into the Metal Men, but they are incapable of assisting her in maintenance. Then she turns to Cyborg, but in the process, she damages him.

Attacked by the combined forces of Young Justice and the Titans, she retreats and switches into an offensive mode. Although the combined forces of the young superheroes best her, adding further damage, she is able to activate a dormant Superman robot before shutting down for repairs. Yet when the android comes after the young heroes (killing Lilith Clay and Donna Troy), Red Arrow (then going by the name "Arsenal") briefly reactivates the young female droid and sends her to stop the Superman Android before shutting down again.

When Red Arrow (still calling himself Arsenal at the time) reforms the Outsiders, he claims the female droid, now called Indigo, as a teammate.

Her memory was supposedly damaged in the aftermath of her dramatic appearance; any remainder was wiped out by S.T.A.R. Labs. Indigo displays a very naive personality, guilelessly taking pleasure in the simple things in life, like laundry, bowling, and watching silent films. She often struggles to learn how to behave in society, and takes her cues from those she lives with. As she grows more integrated in her quest to earn the acceptance and forgiveness of Nightwing and her teammates, she even manages to find love with Shift.

It was revealed in that Indigo is actually Brainiac 8, and every bit the ruthless, inhuman villain that previous Brainiacs were. Indigo as the Outsiders knew her is essentially a subprogram, designed by Brainiac 8's "grandfather", Brainiac 6, to endear her to the superhero community.

Brainiac 8 had been sent back in time to kill Donna Troy, because a living Donna would negate Coluan domination over the "organics" after the "Infinite Crisis" events. After a beating by the combined forces of Teen Titans and Outsiders, the Indigo persona wrests control from Brainiac 8, and reveals herself to be a genuine personality. Weeping, she begs Shift to kill her before the Brainac 8 persona could harm the people she loves. Shift, in tears, transforms her molecular structure into flesh, killing her in the process.

The Origins and Omens back-up story indicated that Indigo might soon return, but writer Judd Winick left the book before this plot thread could be followed up on.

Indigo eventually returns in Teen Titans (vol. 3) #98 as part of Superboy-Prime's Legion of Doom. She now sports a cybernetic arm and eye, the origins of which are unexplained. During Teen Titans (vol. 3) #100, she is once again destroyed by Red Robin and Robin.

In 2016, DC Comics implemented another relaunch of its books called "DC Rebirth", which restored its continuity to a form much as it was prior to "The New 52". Indigo appears as a member of the Fatal Five. While fighting Supergirl, she got torn into pieces by Zor-El. Then, her remains were gathered and shipped to Mokkari from Magog.

Powers and abilities
Indigo possesses an analytical computer-like brain, enabling her to think and perceive information at great speeds. As a unique inorganic being, she can fly, project force fields, and fire blasts of energy from her eyes or hands. Her physical capabilities are far beyond human limitations. She is also able to interact with and control any technology, no matter how modern.

Other characters with the name Indigo
 Indigo was also the name of a character in DP 7, one of the titles of Marvel Comics' short-lived New Universe imprint.
 Indigo was another name used by the DC superhero Deep Blue.
 Indigo was also the name of a member of Sovereign Seven.
 Indigo-1 was also the name of the leader of the Indigo Tribe in The Blackest Night crossover event in 2009. She and her tribe derived their power from compassion.

In other media
 Indigo appears in the first season of Supergirl, portrayed by Laura Vandervoort. Introduced in the episode "Solitude", this version is a contemporary descendant of Brainiac who was imprisoned in the Phantom Zone via the maximum security prison, Fort Rozz, until she joined forces with the other inmates to orchestrate a prison break. Furthermore, she initially assumes a blonde human form on monitors before attaining a form closer to her comics counterpart in the real world. While hacking into a military base's systems, she battles Supergirl before joining forces with fellow escapee and the latter's uncle, Non. Indigo attempts to destroy National City with a nuclear weapon, but is foiled by Winn Schott, who downloads a virus into her. Nonetheless, Non reanimates Indigo. In the episodes "Myriad" and "Better Angels", Non and Indigo attempt to enact Project Myriad, only to be foiled and killed by Supergirl and the Martian Manhunter respectively.
 Indigo, based on the Supergirl incarnation, appears as a playable character in Lego DC Super-Villains via the "DC TV Super-Villains" DLC pack.

References

Characters created by Judd Winick
DC Comics female superheroes
DC Comics American superheroes
DC Comics characters with accelerated healing
DC Comics characters with superhuman strength
DC Comics robots
DC Comics cyborgs
DC Comics extraterrestrial supervillains
DC Comics female supervillains
DC Comics supervillains
Cyborg supervillains
Robot supervillains
Fictional androids
Fictional artificial intelligences
Fictional characters with energy-manipulation abilities
Fictional characters with superhuman durability or invulnerability
Fictional extraterrestrial cyborgs
Fictional extraterrestrial robots
Fictional gynoids
Fictional technopaths